Samantha Poulter, also known as Logic1000 and formerly known as DJ Logic, is an Australian musician. She is signed to Because Music.

Biography 
Samantha Poulter was born in Sydney in the suburb of Yarrawarrah. She cites artists such as Loefah as early influences. Her first forays into music were in her sister's rock band as a drummer, but she soon took to producing herself. In 2020, she moved to Berlin.

She has discussed managing schizophrenia and how its understanding in society is poor, describing how an incident in 2011 nearly led to her serving jail time.

She has a child with her long term partner Tom McAlister.

Career 
Logic1000 initially went under the name DJ Logic, before being served a cease-and-desist order. She relaunched under her updated moniker in 2019.

After getting into electronic music in 2017, she released her first self-titled EP in 2018. Her first break was through Four Tet playing her music in his Coachella set. Remixes for artists such as Caribou, soon followed.

In a cover feature for Mixmag, she revealed her creative process to be collaborative, largely working with her partner Thomas McAlister. She has described herself as "not a technical person". Instead she enjoys working with analogue synths and recording ideas raw. Her music is characterised by euphoric melody.

in December 2020, she was Spotify's EQUAL artist of the month.

In 2021 she released her EP You've Got The Whole Night To Go, and was featured on Essential Mix with BBC Radio 1.

References 

1986 births
Living people
Musicians from Sydney
Australian DJs